Clarence James "Win" Harris (March 27, 1891 – January 23, 1939) was an American Negro league first baseman in the 1910s and 1920s.

A native of Charlottesville, Virginia, Harris made his Negro leagues debut with the Homestead Grays in 1918. He played several seasons with the Grays through 1924. Harris died in Pittsburgh, Pennsylvania in 1939 at age 47.

References

External links
 and Seamheads

1891 births
1939 deaths
Homestead Grays players
20th-century African-American sportspeople
Sportspeople from Charlottesville, Virginia